The Seven Swans is a lost 1917 silent film fantasy starring Marguerite Clark. Famous Players Film Company produced and J. Searle Dawley directed.

Plot
Loosely based on The Wild Swans by Hans Christian Andersen, Clark stars as Princess Tweedledee who later falls in love with Prince Charming. An evil witch, yearning to take over a kingdom, turns the Princess's brothers into swans. Moon Fairies vow to turn her brothers back to humans if she knits them seven robes and not speak to another human for a specified amount of time.

Cast
Marguerite Clark - Princess Tweedledee
William E. Danforth - The King
Augusta Anderson - The Wicked Queen
Edwin Denison - The Lord High Chancellor
Daisy Belmore - The Witch
Richard Barthelmess - Prince Charming
Richard Allen - Princess Tweedeldee's Brother
Jere Austin - Tweedeldee's Brother
Joseph Sterling - Tweedeldee's Brother
Frederick Merrick - Tweedeldee's Brother
Lee F. Daly - Tweedeldee's Brother
Stanley King - Tweedeldee's Brother
Gordon Dana - Tweedeldee's Brother

References

External links
The Seven Swans at IMDb.com
AllMovie.com

1917 films
American silent feature films
Films based on works by Hans Christian Andersen
Films directed by J. Searle Dawley
Paramount Pictures films
Lost American films
American black-and-white films
American fantasy films
1910s fantasy films
1917 lost films
Lost fantasy films
Films based on fairy tales
Works based on The Wild Swans
1910s American films